The New Jersey Society for the Prevention of Cruelty to Animals (colloquially,  "NJSPCA Humane Police") is a law enforcement agency in the state of New Jersey that focuses on humane law enforcement. The agency enforces animal-related laws and investigates cases of animal cruelty. In January 2018, Governor Chris Christie signed a bill intended to dissolve the organization and transfer animal cruelty law enforcement to county prosecutors, municipalities, and county SPCA agencies.  The NJSPCA will cease law enforcement operations by August 1, 2018.  The agency was disbanded in 2018 after a State Commission of Investigation Reports (SCI) showed that the agency could not account for over 700K in Attorney fees, mismanaged bank accounts, and businesses created by its Board Members.  The agency was virtually bankrupt at the time it was disbanded due to a lack of oversight.  The NJSPCA was sued in 2015 under the Open Public Record Act in which it spent 140K on Attorney's fee's.  It was order on 4 separate occasions that they were a Government Agency and subject to OPRA. See Sci Report https://www.nj.gov/sci/pdf/SPCA-FollowUpReport.pdf

History 

The New Jersey Society for the Prevention of Cruelty to Animals (NJSPCA) was created in 1868 to prevent animal cruelty and investigate cases of animal cruelty in New Jersey.  The agents of the NJSPCA were established as law enforcement officers in charge of investigating and prosecuting all persons involved in animal abuse and neglect. The NJSPCA is the second oldest SPCA in the country, behind the ASPCA in New York.  Since it no longer conducts Law Enforcement operations the New Jersey SPCA has diverted its efforts towards fund raising and education on proper animal care and welfare.

Law Enforcement Operations 

From 1868 until 2018 The New Jersey Society for the Prevention of Cruelty to Animals focused on humane law enforcement and investigations of animal cruelty throughout New Jersey. Law Enforcement operations ceased on July 31, 2018.  The agency was one of just a few law enforcement agencies in the state that have statewide authority. The agency use to hire both sworn officers that carry firearms, as well as unarmed investigators.

Humane Law Enforcement Officers 

Humane law enforcement officers (abbreviated as "HLEOs", and also known as humane police officers) are armed and have full law enforcement powers and authority in New Jersey. Officers gain their law enforcement authority through Title 4 of New Jersey statutes, and are permitted and authorized under law to enforce any law or ordinance enacted for the protection of animals.  In addition, HLEOs carry and use firearms, batons, pepper spray, and handcuffs, use physical, less lethal, and deadly force, conduct investigations and surveillance for animal cruelty cases, sign complaints and issue summonses for criminal charges and/or civil violations, confiscate and seize animals, and make arrests with or without warrant for violations of the animal cruelty laws under NJ Title 4. Humane law enforcement officers are sworn officers commissioned by the Superintendent of the New Jersey State Police.

Training 

Humane law enforcement officers and agents are required to complete basic police training as a Humane Law Enforcement Officer (HLEO) at an accredited NJ police academy.  Agents and Officers receive training in Title 4 law, self-defense tactics, usage of baton and pepper spray, investigations, seizing animals, emergency vehicle operations, and report writing. Humane law enforcement officers also receive training in handcuffing techniques and firearms. Training is provided by the NJSPCA, the New Jersey State Police, the New Jersey Division of Criminal Justice (DCJ), and various police academies in the state.

Vehicles and equipment 

The NJSPCA uses various vehicles in its fleet including Ford Crown Victoria Police Interceptors, Chevrolet Express vans, a trailer converted into a mobile command center, and a former army truck.
Their vehicles are equipped with poles and cages for seizures and catches.

Rank structure 
There are eight titles (referred to as ranks) in the New Jersey Society for the Prevention of Cruelty to Animals:

See also 

 American Society for the Prevention of Cruelty to Animals
 List of law enforcement agencies in New Jersey

References

External links
 NJSPCA video

Animal welfare organizations based in the United States
State law enforcement agencies of New Jersey
Government agencies established in 1868
Specialist law enforcement agencies of the United States